ISO 22319:2017 Security and resilience - Community resilience - Guidelines for planning the involvement of spontaneous volunteers, is an international standard developed by ISO/TC 292 Security and resilience and published by the International Organization for Standardization in 2017. ISO 22317 gives various of recommendations on how to deal with spontaneous volunteers (SVs) that show up at the incident scene to help the official emergency management team. 
When emergencies happen, concerned citizens want to help out in many ways. Following a disaster or crisis, members of the public often show up and offer their help.  These  spontaneous volunteers are not usually part of an organized volunteer organization such Search and Rescue Teams or the Humanitarian groups and  may not have any training or experience as a volunteer. However, these volunteers can make very valuable contributions to the emergency response. But they can also present challenges for the emergency managers who may not be prepared for these volunteers. The  purpose of this standard is to help organizations plan for the participation of spontaneous volunteers and to manage their work effectively and safely.   
.

Scope and contents 
ISO 22319 includes the following main clauses:
 Scope
 Normative references
 Terms and definitions
 Preparatory measures 
 Planning for the involvement of SVs 
 Longer-term issues 
Some of the topics covered in the Standard include: 
•	Challenges and benefits spontaneous volunteers bring to an emergency 
•	How to plan for these volunteers and how to manage their involvement 
•	Some of the risks associated with using volunteers in an emergency 
•	How to implement a volunteer management plan
•	How to communicate with the public and volunteers 
•	How to evaluate the impact of these volunteers during the emergency and the longer term recovery

Related standards
ISO 22319 is part of a series of standards on Community resilience. The other standards are: 
 ISO 22315:2015 Societal security – Mass evacuation – Guidelines for planning
 ISO 22392:2020 Security and resilience – Community resilience – Guidelines for conducting peer reviews
 ISO 22395:2018 Security and resilience – Community resilience – Guidelines for supporting vulnerable persons in an emergency
 ISO 22396:2020 Security and resilience – Community resilience – Guidelines for information exchange between organisations

History

See also 
 List of ISO standards
 International Organization for Standardization

References 

Canadian Red Cross, the Salvation Army and St. John Ambulance – Maintaining the Passion:
Sustaining the Emergency Episodic Volunteer

Shaw Duncan Chris M Smith, Graham Heike, Margaret Harris, Judy Scully (2015) Spontaneous
volunteers: Involving citizens in the response and recovery to emergencies. Department for
Environment, Food & Rural Affairs. Final report. HM Government, London, UK. Project: FD2666.

Rivera JD, Wood ZD. Disaster relief volunteerism: Evaluating cities' planning for the usage and management of spontaneous volunteers. J Emerg Manag. 2016 Mar-Apr;14(2):127-38. doi: 10.5055/jem.2016.0279. .

Joshua Whittaker, Blythe McLennan, John Handmer, A review of informal volunteerism in emergencies and disasters: Definition, opportunities and challenges,International Journal of Disaster Risk Reduction,Volume 13,2015,Pages 358–368,ISSN 2212-4209

External links 
  ISO 22395— Security and resilience - Community resilience - Guidelines for supporting vulnerable persons in an emergency
 ISO TC 292— Security and resilience
 ISO 22319 at isotc292online.org

22319